Max Thomas (28 June 1921 – 20 May 2001) was an Australian cricketer. He played nineteen first-class matches for Tasmania between 1945 and 1957.

See also
 List of Tasmanian representative cricketers

References

External links
 

1921 births
2001 deaths
Australian cricketers
Tasmania cricketers
Cricketers from Launceston, Tasmania